Andrina Hodel (born 2 June 2000) is a Swiss athlete. She competed in the women's pole vault event at the 2020 Summer Olympics.

References

External links
 

2000 births
Living people
Swiss female pole vaulters
Athletes (track and field) at the 2020 Summer Olympics
Olympic athletes of Switzerland
Place of birth missing (living people)